Katherine Arden Burdine (born 1987), best known by her pen name Katherine Arden, is an American novelist. Known primarily for her Winternight trilogy of fantasy novels, which are set in medieval Russia and have garnered nominations for Hugo and Locus Awards, she is also the author of the Small Spaces series of horror novels for middle grade children. The first in the latter series, Small Spaces, won the Vermont Golden Dome Book Award in 2020.

Biography 
Arden was born in Austin, Texas, and currently resides in Vermont. She spent a year in Moscow after high school before returning to Vermont. She attended Middlebury College, graduating with a degree in Russian and French in 2011.

After graduating, and uncertain what she wanted to do, Arden took a job on a farm in Hawaii. Bored with the job, she took to writing in her spare time, and "the rest of the writing process just sort of happened in stops and starts."

Arden's writing is influenced by J.R.R Tolkien, Mary Renault, Naomi Novik, Patrick O'Brian, Dorothy Dunnett, Diana Gabaldon, and Robin McKinley.

Bibliography

Winternight trilogy

 The Bear and the Nightingale (2017)
 The Girl in the Tower (2017)
 The Winter of the Witch (2019)

Small Spaces series
 Small Spaces (2018)
 Dead Voices (2019)
 Dark Waters (2021)
 Empty Smiles (2022)

Awards and nominations 
 2018: Finalist for the John W. Campbell Award for Best New Writer
 2018: Finalist for the Locus Award for Best First Novel, The Bear and the Nightingale
 2018: Finalist for the Vermont Book Award for Fiction, The Bear and the Nightingale
 2019: Finalist for the John W. Campbell Award for Best New Writer
 2020: Finalist for the Hugo Award for Best Series, Winternight trilogy
 2020: Winner of the Vermont Golden Dome Book Award, Small Spaces

References

External links 
 

1987 births
Living people
21st-century American novelists
21st-century American women writers
American fantasy writers
American women novelists
American young adult novelists
Writers from Austin, Texas
Women writers of young adult literature
Novelists from Texas
Novelists from Vermont
Middlebury College alumni
American expatriates in Russia
Women science fiction and fantasy writers